Yalovaspor BK, more commonly known as Semt77 Yalovaspor because of sponsorship reasons, is a Turkish professional basketball club based in Yalova, which currently competes in the Turkish Basketball First League (TBL). The team was founded in 1998 and got promoted to the top division in 2021. Their home arena is 90. Yıl Spor Salonu with a capacity of 2,000 seats. The team is sponsored by Semt77.

History
Yalovaspor BK was founded in 1998. In 2016 they have been promoted to Turkish Basketball First League (TBL). On 15 June 2021, Semt77 Yalovaspor promoted to the BSL for the first time in club history as winners of the TBL play-offs.

Sponsorship names
 Yalova Group Belediyespor: 2015–2019
 Semt77 Yalovaspor: 2019–present

Players

Current roster

Notable players

  C. J. Williams

Honours
Turkish Basketball First League
Runners-up (1): 2020–21

References

External links 
 Official Page in Turkish Basketball Federation website 
 Eurobasket.com Page
 Twitter Page
 Facebook Page

Basketball teams in Turkey
Basketball teams established in 1998